Somerton is an unincorporated community in Belmont County, in the U.S. state of Ohio.

History
Somerton was laid out around 1818. The community's name is derived from Somerset, England. A post office called Somerton was established in 1827.

References

Unincorporated communities in Belmont County, Ohio
1818 establishments in Ohio
Populated places established in 1818
Unincorporated communities in Ohio